NTLDR (abbreviation of NT loader) is the boot loader for all releases of Windows NT operating system from 1993 with the release of Windows NT 3.1 up until Windows XP and Windows Server 2003. From Windows Vista onwards it was replaced by the BOOTMGR bootloader. NTLDR is typically run from the primary storage device, but it can also run from portable storage devices such as a CD-ROM, USB flash drive, or floppy disk. NTLDR can also load a non NT-based operating system given the appropriate boot sector in a file.

NTLDR requires, at the minimum, the following two files to be on the system volume:

 , the main boot loader itself
 , required for booting an NT-based OS, detects basic hardware information needed for successful boot

An additional important file is boot.ini, which contains boot configuration (if missing, NTLDR will default to \Windows on the first partition of the first hard drive).

NTLDR is launched by the volume boot record of system partition, which is typically written to the disk by the Windows  or  command.

History
Windows NT was originally designed for ARC-compatible platforms, relying on its boot manager support and providing only osloader.exe, a loading program accepting ordinary command-line arguments specifying Windows directory partition, location or boot parameters, which is launched by ARC-compatible boot manager when a user chooses to start specific Windows NT operating system. However, because the x86 lacked any of the ARC support, the additional layer was added specifically for that platform: custom boot manager code presenting text menu allowing the user to choose from one or more operating system and its options configured in boot.ini configuration file, prepended by special StartUp module which is responsible for some preparations such as switching the CPU to the protected mode. When a user chooses an operating system from the boot menu, the following command-line arguments are then passed to the part of the osloader.exe common to all processor architectures:

In Windows releases starting from Windows Vista and Windows Server 2008, NTLDR has been split off back to its boot manager and system loader parts: the Windows Boot Manager and winload.exe. The boot manager part has been completely rewritten; it no longer uses boot.ini as a configuration file, although the bootcfg utility for modifying boot.ini is still present for the case of multi-boot configurations with Windows versions up to Windows XP and Windows Server 2003.

Command-line interface

The bootsect.exe utility program in the Windows PE tools has options /nt52 (NTLDR) and /nt60 (Vista and up) to store a NTLDR or Vista boot record in the first sector of a specified partition. The command can be used for FAT and NTFS based file systems. It replaces the FixFAT and FixNTFS tools.

Example
The following example applies the NTLDR compatible master boot code to the D: volume:
C:\>bootsect /nt52 D:

Startup process

When a PC is powered on its BIOS follows the configured boot order to find a bootable device. This can be a harddisk, floppy, CD/DVD, network connection, USB-device, etc. depending on the BIOS. In the case of a floppy the BIOS interprets its boot sector (first sector) as code, for NTLDR this could be a NTLDR boot sector looking for the ntldr file on the floppy. For a harddisk the code in the Master Boot Record (first sector) determines the active partition. The code in the boot sector of the active partition could then be again a NTLDR boot sector looking for ntldr in the root directory of this active partition. In a more convoluted scenario the active partition can contain a Vista boot sector for the newer Vista boot manager with an {ntldr} entry pointing to another partition with a NTLDR boot sector.

When booting, the loader portion of NTLDR does the following in order:

Accesses the file system on the boot drive (either FAT or New Technology File System, NTFS).
If Windows was put in the hibernation state, the contents of hiberfil.sys are loaded into memory and the system resumes where it left off.
Otherwise, reads boot.ini and prompts the user with the boot menu accordingly.
If a non NT-based OS is selected, NTLDR loads the associated file listed in boot.ini (bootsect.dos if no file is specified or if the user is booting into a DOS based OS) and gives it control.
If an NT-based OS is selected, NTLDR runs ntdetect.com, which gathers information about the computer's hardware. (If ntdetect.com hangs during hardware detection, there is a debug version called ntdetect.chk that can be found on Microsoft support.)
Starts Ntoskrnl.exe, passing to it the information returned by ntdetect.com.

boot.ini 
NTLDR's first action is to read the Boot.ini file. NTLDR allows the user to choose which operating system to boot from at the menu. For NT and NT-based operating systems, it also allows the user to pass preconfigured options to the kernel. The menu options are stored in boot.ini, which itself is located in the root of the same disk as NTLDR.  Though NTLDR can boot DOS and non-NT versions of Windows, boot.ini cannot configure their boot options.

For NT-based OSs, the location of the operating system is written as an Advanced RISC Computing (ARC) path.

boot.ini is protected from user configuration by having the following file attributes: system, hidden, read-only. To manually edit it, the user would first have to remove these attributes.
A more secure fashion to edit the file is to use the bootcfg command from a console. bootcfg will also relock the file (setting the file back to system, hidden, and read-only). Additionally, the file can be edited within Windows using a text editor if the folder view option "Show hidden files and folders" is selected, the folder view option "Hide protected operating system files" is unchecked, and the "Read-only" option is unchecked under the file's properties.

bootsect.dos is the boot sector loaded by NTLDR to load DOS, or if there is no file specified when loading a non NT-based OS.

Example 
An example of a boot.ini file:
[boot loader]
timeout=40
default=multi(0)disk(0)rdisk(0)partition(1)\WINDOWS
[operating systems]
multi(0)disk(0)rdisk(0)partition(1)\WINDOWS="Microsoft Windows XP Professional" /fastdetect

If the boot loader timeout option in boot.ini is set to 0, the NTLDR boot menu does not appear.
Extreme caution should be taken when modifying the boot loader, as erroneous information can result in an OS that fails to boot.

NT kernel switches 

   Forces x86-based systems to increase the virtual address space allocated for user  programs to 3 GB, and to decrease to 1 GB allocated to the kernel and to executive components.  Used for some programs that require more than the standard 2 GB allocated to user programs and 2 GB allocated to the system.  Some configurations of Windows Server 2003 that run virtual memory-intensive applications such as database servers or Microsoft Exchange Server 2003 may require this switch or may benefit from improved performance. Activating this option may break VMR-9 video. Activating this option may also cause audio problems with Creative SB X-Fi series sound cards with (X-Fi Gamer / X-Fi Titanium @ WINXP 32-bit 3/2012). These problems may be connected to the way that Creatives drivers handle memory over 2 GB.
   Forces the system into standard 640 × 480 16-color VGA mode by using a video device driver that is compatible with any video adapter. If the operating system fails to load due to a faulty or incorrectly configured video driver, this switch allows the system to load, so the user may then remove, update, or roll back the video driver causing the problem.  Using this switch in conjunction with the  switch helps to determine the driver that is triggering a failure.
   Sets the baud rate of the debug port that is used for kernel debugging. Use of this switch automatically enables the  switch.  Specifies an override for the default baud rate (19200) at which a remote kernel debugger host will connect.  Example: .
   Turns on boot logging to a file named .
   Displays an alternate 640 × 480 16-color custom bitmap. The bitmap must be saved in the \Windows directory with the name . Use with the  switch.
   Specifies the amount of memory, in megabytes, that Windows cannot use. Use this parameter to confirm a performance problem or other problems that are related to RAM depletion.
   Use with the  switch and the  switch to selects the IEEE 1394 interface channel (numbered 0 to 62) through which kernel debugging communications will flow.
   Loads the kernel debugger at OS startup, but it remains inactive until a Stop error occurs. With this switch, the COM port can be used for normal operations while Windows is running. If Windows crashes, the switch converts the port to a debug port. (This action turns on remote debugging.)
   Turns on the kernel debugger when Windows starts. Unlike the  switch,  uses the COM port whether you use debugging or not.
   Specifies the COM port to use for the debug port. By default,  uses COM2 if it exists. Otherwise, the default is COM1. Use of this switch automatically enables the  switch.
   Turns off serial and bus mouse detection for the specified port(s), or for all ports if none are specified. Use this switch when there is a component other than a mouse attached to a serial port during the startup process. Ports may be separated with commas to turn off more than one port. (Note: In earlier versions of Windows, including Windows NT 4.0, this switch was named .)
   Defines the Hardware Abstraction Layer that is loaded at startup. This switch is also useful when you want to try to switch between starting in multiprocessor mode and starting in single processor mode. To do this, use this switch with the  switch. filename must be in System32 directory. It can be a simple file, hard link, but not a symbolic link or a junction point.
   Defines the kernel that is loaded at startup. With this switch, the user can switch between a debug-enabled kernel that is full of debugging code and a regular kernel. Same limitations for filename location and type as for /HAL switch.
   Specifies the maximum amount of RAM, in megabytes, that Windows can use. However, the  switch does not account for memory holes. Therefore, it is recommended to use the  switch instead.
   This option is used by Windows Preinstallation Environment (WinPE) and loads the Registry SYSTEM hive as a volatile hive such that changes made to it in memory are not saved back to the hive image.
   Turns off debugging. This scenario can cause a Stop Error if a program has a debug hardcoded breakpoint in its software.
 }  This option is only available on 32-bit versions of Windows when running on processors supporting Data Execution Prevention (DEP). It enables DEP, which results in the memory manager marking pages containing data as no-execute so that they cannot be executed as code. This can be useful for preventing malicious code from exploiting buffer overflow bugs with unexpected program input in order to execute arbitrary code. No-execute protection is always enabled on 64-bit versions of Windows on processors that support no-execute protection. There are several options the user can specify with this switch:
   Enables DEP for core system images and those specified in the DEP configuration dialog.
   Enables DEP for all images except those specified in the DEP configuration dialog.
   Enables DEP on all images.
   Disables DEP.
   Displays the device driver names while they are being loaded. Use with the  switch to determine the driver that is triggering a failure.
   Forces Ntldr to load the non-Physical Address Extension (PAE) version of the Windows kernel, even if the system is detected as supporting x86 PAEs and has more than 4 GB of physical memory.
   (Obsolete on all versions post-Windows NT 4.0) Replaced by the absence of the  switch. Disables serial mouse detection on the specified COM ports. Using  without specifying a COM port disables serial mouse detection on all COM ports.
   Sets the number of processors that Windows will run at startup. With this switch, the user can force a multiprocessor system to use only the quantity of processors (number) that you specify. Useful for troubleshooting performance problems and defective CPUs.
   Equivalent to using . Causes Windows to use only one CPU on a multiprocessor system.
   Enables Physical Address Extension support. In Safe Mode, the computer starts by using normal kernels, even if the  switch is specified.
   For x86-based systems, this stops the operating system from dynamically assigning hardware input, hardware output, and interrupt request resources to PCI devices. Instead, the BIOS configures the devices.
   Turns on Emergency Management Services (EMS) on a Windows Server 2003, Enterprise Edition-based computer. To turn on EMS by editing the Boot.ini on an x86-based computer, edit both the [boot loader] section and the [operating systems] section of the Boot.ini file.
   Causes Windows to start in Safe Mode. You must include the colon plus one of the three types listed above. The following examples illustrate the parameters that are in effect when you select a Safe Mode option from the startup recovery menu.
 Safe Mode  Default: Uses a minimal set of device drivers and services to start Windows.
 Safe Mode with Networking  Default mode together with the drivers necessary to load networking.
 Safe Mode with Command Prompt  Default mode, except that Cmd.exe starts instead of Windows Explorer.
 Windows in Directory Services Restore Mode  (This mode is valid only for Windows-based domain controllers.) Performs a directory service repair.
   Disables the graphical boot screen and uses the NT4 style text-boot, listing the Windows build number, version number, etc. In Windows 2000 and XP, the text is rendered inside the CHKDSK bitmap (and with a progress bar in 2000).
   Specifies that Windows uses the Power Management Timer (PM_TIMER) timer settings instead of the Time Stamp Counter (TSC) timer settings if the processor supports the PM_TIMER settings. By default, Windows Server 2003 Service Pack 2 (SP2) uses the PM timer for all multiprocessor APIC or ACPI HALs. If you are not running Windows Server 2003 SP2, you must force the computer to use the PM timer by using the  switch.
   Customizes the amount of memory, in megabytes, that is allocated to processes when using the  switch. This switch permits more page table entry kernel memory but still maintains almost 3 GB of process memory space.
   Instructs the Windows core time function to ignore the year that the computer's real-time clock reports and instead use the one indicated. Example: . (This switch was created to assist in Y2K testing.)

See also 
 Windows Vista startup process
 Windows NT startup process
 ntoskrnl.exe
 ntdetect.com
 Emergency Management Services
 Comparison of boot loaders
 Windows Boot Manager

References

External links 
 How to edit the Boot.ini file in Windows XP
 BOOT.INI and ARC Path Naming Conventions and Usage
 How to fix "NTLDR Is Missing" error
 Explanation of BOOT.INI by Daniel B. Sedory

Windows components
Boot loaders